Liam Dougherty (born May 4, 1984 in Prince Albert, Saskatchewan) is a Canadian ice dancer. He competed with partners Mylène Girard, Terra Findlay and Melissa Piperno.

Career 
He began skating at age eight and switched to ice dancing at age 13. Early in his career, he partnered with Tanith Belbin for a short time. He began skating with Piperno in 1999. Together they are the 2003 Canadian junior national champion and placed 10th at the 2003 World Junior Figure Skating Championships as well as competed on both the Junior Grand Prix and the senior Grand Prix of Figure Skating. That partnership ended in 2004 and Dougherty was left without a partner for over a year. He attended the 2005 Canadian Championships as a reporter for the Yukon News. He teamed up with Terra Findlay later that year. They competed together for two seasons.

After that partnership ended in 2007, Dougherty teamed up with Mylene Girard. They placed 10th at the 2007 Nebelhorn Trophy. Their partnership ended following that season.

Competitive highlights
(with Girard)

(with Findlay)

(with Piperno)

References

External links
 

Canadian male ice dancers
1984 births
Living people
Sportspeople from Prince Albert, Saskatchewan